Protechiurus edmondsi is a species of fossil animal from the Ediacaran Nama group of Namibia. It was initially interpreted as an echiurid worm. It has been placed as a "vendobiont", on the hypothesis that the  Edicarian fauna represent a distinct phylum. It has also been suggested that it may be an ecdysozoan.

The identity of P. edmondsi identity is still unclear, as originally, Martin Glaessner put it into the worm phylum Echiura, family Echiuridae. Although Runnegar though that it was actually a Dubiofossil, although other palaeontologists have suggested that it may be a Proto-Chordate.

See also
Vendoconularia
List of Ediacaran genera

References

Ediacaran life
Ediacaran first appearances
Enigmatic animal taxa
Fossils of Namibia